Rodovia Santos Dumont (officially designated SP-075) is a highway in the state of São Paulo, Brazil.

It runs in a north–south direction and interconnects the cities of Campinas, Indaiatuba, Salto, Itu and Sorocaba, crossing with two other major highways, Rodovia Castelo Branco, nearby Sorocaba, and the Rodovia dos Bandeirantes nearby Campinas, thus forming a vertex of the Macrometropolitan Highway Ring of São Paulo. At the km 66 of Rodovia Santos Dumont there is the Viracopos Airport.

The highway honours the Brazilian inventor Alberto Santos-Dumont, considered the "father of aviation". Santos Dumont was born in the town of Palmira (today called Santo Dumont) in the state of Minas Gerais but at one point in his life he also studied in Campinas. Rodovia Santos Dumont is a road system managed and maintained through a state concession to private company Rodovias das Colinas, and therefore it is a toll road.

See also
 Highway system of São Paulo
 Brazilian Highway System

Transport in Campinas
Highways in São Paulo (state)